"Lessons in Love" is a single from the English band Level 42, released in 1986 from the album Running in the Family, issued one year later. This single is the band's biggest hit in their homeland, where it reached number three on the UK Singles Chart, and internationally, entering the top 10 in numerous countries, reaching the number-one spot in five of them: Spain, Germany, South Africa, Switzerland, and Finland. "Lessons in Love" is also one of the few singles from the band that broke into the Billboard Hot 100, where it reached number 12 in 1987. It is the first of five singles from their 1987 album, Running in the Family, and it made way for the success of other singles from the album. In 2012, David Quantick described it in Q magazine as 'one of the best singles of the 80s'.

Writing and recording
According to bassist Mark King, the song started out as a melody from an add-on closing sequence for the live rendition of "Physical Presence" (from the World Machine album) on The Tube on 18 October 1985.

In December 1985, just after Christmas, King put together a rough version of the song using a Sony digital recorder, featuring a verse, chorus and a bridge. The following January, he and producer/co-writer Wally Badarou revisited the tapes and deemed the original chorus weak; so the latter re-wrote the song’s chorus from turning around the chorus chords and suggested King a new vocal line.

A couple of months later, in early March 1986, the song was recorded with the band at Maison Rouge Studios in London. Altogether it has seven basslines - three analog synths, two FM synths and two electric basses (one thumb line and a finger-style line). Synths included a Synclavier, Prophet-5, Prophet-600, Yamaha DX7 and Yamaha TX816 rack — these were all kept in sync with a Garfield Electronics Doctor Click rhythm controller.

Track listing
United Kingdom (1986) 12"
"Lessons in Love" (Extended version)
"Something About You" (Remix)
"Hot Water" (live)

Australia (1986) 12"
"Lessons in Love (Extended version)
"World Machine"
"Hot Water" (live)

United States (1987) 7"
"Lessons in Love"
"Hot Water" (live)

Chart performance

Weekly charts

1Remix

Year-end charts

Sales and certifications

See also
List of number-one hits of 1986 (Germany)
List of number-one singles of 1986 (Spain)
List of number-one singles of the 1980s (Switzerland)

References

1986 singles
1986 songs
Level 42 songs
Number-one singles in Finland
Number-one singles in Germany
Number-one singles in South Africa
Number-one singles in Spain
Number-one singles in Switzerland
Polydor Records singles
Songs written by Boon Gould
Songs written by Mark King (musician)